Cielo rojo is a Mexican telenovela produced by Rafael Uriostegui for Azteca. Starring Edith González and Mauricio Islas, co-starring by Alejandra Lazcano and Lambda García, and with the antagonistic participations of Regina Torné, Andrea Noli, Ramiro Huerta, Gabriela Vergara, Aura Cristina Geithner, Alberto Casanova, Betty Monroe and Andrea Escalona Filming lasted from 4 April 2011 to 1 December 2011. It premiered on 23 May 2011 on Azteca Trece, occupying Entre el Amor y el Deseos slot.

Plot
It tells the passionate story of Alma, a great woman willing to collect from life what she owes. In the past he had a great love, Andrés Renteria, but fate was responsible for separating them. Alma is a young woman who is married to Victor, a man who suffers from diabetes, and who widely obeys his mother, Doña Loreto. Victor coldly beat Alma, who suffered from his mistreatment. Some time later Víctor apologizes to Alma, and tells him that his situation will change. Rebirth of love One day Víctor introduces him to Andrés, but Alma and Andrés have really known each other since their adolescence, and had given themselves, for which their love is reborn. Alma and Andrés keep their love secret for weeks, until they decide to escape and live their love together. Precisely the day that Alma and Andrés decide to escape, in the midst of their jealousy, Víctor has a strong argument with Alma, but Víctor feels bad about his illness, falling and hitting his head. Tragedy Doña Loreto, the only person present, blames Alma to the police, saying that she murdered her son, for which Alma is unjustly put in prison. Meanwhile Doña Loreto and Bernardo, put together a plan and tell Andrés that Alma and Víctor reconciled and traveled to a second honeymoon. Andrés suffering consoles himself in the arms of Lucrecia, who was already supposedly pregnant by Andrés. In prison, Alma gives birth to a girl, Andrés's daughter. Her ex-mother-in-law, even knowing that she is not her granddaughter, finds a way to take it off, and disappears with the little girl. Andrés marries his old girlfriend, who pretends to be pregnant with him, although in reality the child is someone else's. Alma spends twenty years in jail, believing that Andrés ignored her and did not want to help her. Andrés, for his part, is convinced that she decided to stay by her husband's side and forget about him.

Alma leaves prison, full of bitterness, after everything she has had to go through. She is determined to get her daughter back, but she doesn't know where to start. Fate makes her meet Gonzalo, a wealthy old farmer, who always felt a strong attraction to her. Gonzalo is a nice and irreverent man. He's infatuated with her ... but ends up falling in love and offering her marriage. Alma, after many doubts, agrees to marry him. Gonzalo has managed to earn it. At his side she has fun, she feels safe. Andrés has led a gray life, dedicated to his work and what his son believes. Your marriage has been a failure. He could never love his wife, because the memory of Alma has not left him alone. Andrés and Alma meet again, and a whirlwind breaks out around them. They are surrounded by guilt, disappointment, deceit and endless stumbling blocks. Their lives are intertwined again, not only for them, but for their children, who love each other intensely. However, there can be nothing between the two boys, since they are apparently brothers. The lives of Andrés and Alma are in the middle of a labyrinth that seems to have no way out. Passions, ambitions, intrigues, unavoidable commitments, and many deceptions will continue to separate them, while they continue to walk under a "red sky" that is determined not to allow them to unite and be happy.

Cast
Edith González as Alma Durán
Mauricio Islas as Andrés Rentería
Regina Torné as Loreto Encinas 
Andrea Noli as Lucrecia Robledo 
Aura Cristina Geithner as Mariana Robledo 
Andrés Palacios as Nathán Gárces 
Alejandra Lazcano as Daniela Rentería 
Alberto Casanova as Ricardo Molina 
Carmen Beato as Natalia "Nata" Aguilar
Daniel Martínez as Marcos Ávila 
Héctor Parra as Jesús Galván 
Jorge Luís Vásquez as Alonso Nájera
Hernán Mendoza as Bernardo Trejo / Román 
Alan Ciangherotti as Carlos "Calo" Aguirre 
Fernando Lozano as Salomón Ramos 
Ramiro Huerta as Víctor Encinas / David Mansetti 
Betty Monroe as Sofía Márquez
Simone Victoria as Carolina Vidal
Jorge Galván as Fabián 
 Lambda García as Sebastián Rentería 
Andrea Escalona as Patricia "Paty" Molina 
Humberto Búa as Gastón "Choncho" Molina
Gloria Stalina as Rosa "Rosita" Trejo 
Daniela Gamba as Andrea Vidal
María José Magan as Verónica Conde 
Patrick Fernández as César Ávila
Gabriela Vergara as Aleida Ramos 
Martín Soto as Toto
Luciano Zacharsky as Álvaro Robledo 
Hugo Stiglitz as Gonzalo Molina 
Sergio Klainer as Ángel Durán 
Sandra Itzel as Alma Durán 
Alonso Espeleta as Andrés Rentería
Jorge Levy as Padre Servando 
Roxana Saucedo as Leticia 
Giovani Florido as Ismael Gomár
Ramón Medina Orellana as Silverio

References

External links

2011 telenovelas
2011 Mexican television series debuts
2012 Mexican television series endings
Mexican telenovelas
TV Azteca telenovelas
Spanish-language telenovelas